Antra Liedskalniņa (born 22 October 1930 in Jaungulbene, died 20 April 2000) was a Latvian actress.

Selected filmography
I Remember Everything, Richard (1966)
Pūt, vējiņi (1973)
Baiga vasara (2000)

Theatre credits

References

External links

1930 births
2000 deaths
Latvian film actresses
Latvian stage actresses
20th-century Latvian actresses
People from Gulbene Municipality